Li Xiaoni (born May 10, 1986 in Qingdao, Shandong) is a female Chinese sports sailor. She competed for Team China at the 2008 Summer Olympics.

Major performances
 2003 National Youth Championships - 4th 470 class;
 2005 National Youth Championships - 2nd 470 class;
 2006 Qingdao International Regatta - 3rd Yngling class

References
 http://2008teamchina.olympic.cn/index.php/personview/personsen/5137

1986 births
Living people
Chinese female sailors (sport)
Olympic sailors of China
Sportspeople from Qingdao
Sailors at the 2008 Summer Olympics – Yngling
Sportspeople from Shandong
Sailors at the 2010 Asian Games
Asian Games competitors for China
21st-century Chinese women